The 2016 United States presidential election in Oklahoma was held on Tuesday, November 8, 2016, as part of the 2016 United States presidential election in which all 50 states plus the District of Columbia participated. Oklahoma voters chose electors to represent them in the Electoral College via a popular vote, pitting the Republican Party's nominee, businessman Donald Trump, and running mate Indiana Governor Mike Pence against Democratic Party nominee, former Secretary of State Hillary Clinton, and her running mate Virginia Senator Tim Kaine. Oklahoma has seven electoral votes in the Electoral College.

Oklahoma has been a Republican-leaning state since 1952, and a Republican stronghold since 1980. Trump subsequently carried the state with 65.3% of the vote, while Clinton received 28.9%. Considered a safe Republican state, Oklahoma has voted Republican in fifteen of the last sixteen elections. It was also one of two states where Trump won every county, the other being West Virginia. This also marked the fourth consecutive election in which the Republican candidate carried every county in the state.

Gary Johnson, the Libertarian Party candidate, became the first third-party candidate to achieve ballot access in Oklahoma since 2000. He received 5.75% of the vote, the highest percentage for a third party in the state since Ross Perot's campaign in 1996. He was also the only third-party candidate to successfully file for ballot access in Oklahoma.

Primary elections

Democratic primary

 Results

Republican primary

Twelve candidates appeared on the Republican presidential primary ballot:

Polling

General election

Predictions
The following are final 2016 predictions from various organizations for Oklahoma as of Election Day.

Statewide results

Results by county

By congressional district
Trump won all five congressional districts.

Analysis
The Republican Party candidate, Donald Trump, carried Oklahoma with a victory margin of 36.39%. While Trump improved over Mitt Romney's 2012 vote total and victory margin, his vote percentage of 65.3% was down from Romney's 66.8%, making 2016 the first time since 1992 the Republican's vote percentage decreased from the previous election. Hillary Clinton's vote percentage of 28.9% is the worst for a Democratic candidate in Oklahoma since George McGovern's 24% in the 1972 election. In terms of margin of victory, this is the largest loss by a Democrat since Democratic nominee Walter Mondale in 1984. Clinton however, did make gains in heavily populated Oklahoma County, its surrounding suburban counties, and Tulsa County. In Oklahoma County, Clinton reduced a 16.66% advantage for Romney into a 10.5% advantage for Trump, while Trump was held below the 60% mark in Tulsa. Gary Johnson's total was more than twice what was needed to preserve recognized status for the Libertarian Party in the state, meaning that in 2018 the LP will be the first alternative party on the ballot for a gubernatorial election since the Reform Party in 1998.

With 65.32% of the popular vote, Oklahoma would prove to be Trump's third strongest state in the 2016 election after Wyoming and West Virginia. His win in the 2nd Congressional District was the second best of the five congressional districts in Oklahoma that he won, and he also carried the critical Native American vote in the state (this included all the counties of the proposed Native American state of Sequoyah). The state would also prove to be Gary Johnson's fourth strongest state with 5.75% of the popular vote after New Mexico, North Dakota and Alaska.

Slates of electors
Republican: David Oldham, Teresa Lyn Turner, Mark Thomas, Bobby Cleveland, Lauree Elizabeth Marshall, Charles W. Potts, George W. Wiland, Jr

Libertarian: Erin Adams, Mikel Dillon, Joel Britt Dixon, Rex L. Lawhorn, Ephriam Zachary Knight, Craig A. Dawkins, Mark C. DeShazo

Democrat: Marq Lewis, Bill John Baker, Mark Hammons, Betty McElderry, W. A. Drew Edmondson, Jeannie McDaniel, Rhonda Walters

See also
 United States presidential elections in Oklahoma
 2016 Democratic Party presidential debates and forums
 2016 Democratic Party presidential primaries
 2016 Republican Party presidential debates and forums
 2016 Republican Party presidential primaries

References

OK
2016
Presidential